The Fermatta Music University Center is a higher education music school located in Mexico City, Mexico with an additional campus in Guadalajara, Mexico. The academy was founded in 1993. Fermatta Music University Center is a founding member of the International Association of Music Colleges and Universities. It is the first institution of musical education at the professional level endorsed by the Ministry of Education in Mexico. Jack White is the honorary dean of Fermatta Music Academy.

History
The Fermatta Music University Center was founded in 1993.

In 2013, Fermatta Music University Center named Jack White an honorary dean. White was the first musician to receive the award in the academy’s history. He visited the academy for its 20th anniversary on August 22, 2013. The academy also awarded White with a Lifetime Achievement award on his visit.

Education
The university center offers a Bachelor of Music program in performance, composition and music engineering and production. Other programs include an electronic music production and DJ certification and a graduate certificate program with studies in marketing, promotion, publishing, royalties, concerts and tours.

The academy offers a student exchange program with The Institute of Contemporary Music Performance in London, UK and the Los Angeles College of Music in Los Angeles, California.

See also
Music of Mexico

References

Music schools in Mexico
Guadalajara, Jalisco
Arts organizations established in 1993